This is a list of breweries in Oklahoma, a U.S. state.

History
Brewing in Tulsa dates back to the late 1930s with the Ahrens Brewing Company and their Ranger Beer line. The Ahrens Brewing Company opened in May 1938 as a large scale production brewery which employed more than 30 people at its onset. Their Ranger Beer, Ranger Special Brew, and Ranger Winter Brew were popular among Tulsans of the time; however the brewery experienced only a short existence. They were forced into bankruptcy in February 1940. The details of what went wrong with the brewery have been lost over time, but it is believed that the Ahrens were put out of business by “unfair” practices from the breweries in Oklahoma City.

The number of new breweries opening and in planning has increased recently in Oklahoma.

Breweries
 (405) Brewing Co. – Norman
 American Solera – Tulsa
 Angry Scotsman Brewing – Oklahoma City
 Anthem Brewing Company – Oklahoma City
 Battered Boar Brewing Company – Oklahoma City
 Black Mesa Brewing Company – Norman
Broken Arrow Brewing Company – Broken Arrow
Cabin Boys Brewing – Tulsa
 Choc Beer Company – Krebs
 COOP Ale Works – Oklahoma City
 Dead Armadillo Craft Brewing – Tulsa
 Elk Valley Brewing Company – Oklahoma City
Frenzy Brewing Company – Edmond
Heirloom Rustic Ales – Tulsa
 High Gravity Brewing Company – Tulsa
 Huebert Brewing Company – Oklahoma City
Iron Monk Brewing Company – Stillwater
Kochendorfer Brewing Co. - Duncan
 Lazy Circles Brewing – Norman
 Marshall Brewing Company – Tulsa
 Mustang Brewing Company – Oklahoma City
 New Era: Fine Fermentations – Tulsa
 Nothing's Left Brewing Company – Tulsa
 Prairie Artisan Ales – Tulsa
 Redbud Brewing Company – Oklahoma City
Renaissance Brewing Company – Tulsa
 Roughtail Brewing Company – Midwest City
 Stonecloud Brewing Company – Oklahoma City
 Welltown Brewing – Tulsa

Brewpubs
 Belle Isle Restaurant and Brewing Company – Oklahoma City
 Bricktown Brewery – Oklahoma City
 Mountain Fork Brewery – Broken Bow
 Pete's Place – Krebs
 Royal Bavaria – Moore
 OAK & ORE Craft Beer Taproom - Oklahoma City

See also 
 Beer in the United States
 List of breweries in the United States
 List of microbreweries

References

External links
 Map of Oklahoma breweries

Oklahoma
Lists of buildings and structures in Oklahoma